Abacetus aeneolus is a species of ground beetle in the subfamily Pterostichinae. It was described by Chaudoir in 1869 and is an endemic species found in Namibia.

References

Endemic fauna of Namibia
aeneobus
Beetles described in 1869
Insects of Southern Africa